Dave Donaldson (born 4 June 1978) is a Canadian economist and a professor of economics at Massachusetts Institute of Technology.  He was awarded the 2017 John Bates Clark Medal and elected fellow of the American Academy of Arts and Sciences in 2020.

Academic career
Donaldson received a Masters in Physics from University of Oxford (Trinity College) in 2001, and a Diploma in 2002, an M.Sc. in 2003 and a Ph.D. in 2009, all in Economics from the London School of Economics.  His research explores welfare and economic growth effects of market integration; broad impacts of reduced intra-national trade barriers; and how climate-change-effects-on-humans, as well as food security and famine risks may each be mediated by trade and specialization.

He serves as a co-editor of Econometrica from 2019 to 2023.

Selected publications

References

External links
 Website at MIT
 Personal Website 
 

1978 births
Living people
Environmental economists
Alumni of Trinity College, Oxford
Alumni of the London School of Economics
Stanford University faculty
MIT School of Humanities, Arts, and Social Sciences faculty
Fellows of the Econometric Society
21st-century  Canadian  economists
Fellows of the American Academy of Arts and Sciences